The Vision and the Voice (Liber 418) is a book by Aleister Crowley (1875–1947). It chronicles the mystical journey of the author as he explored the 30 Enochian aethyrs originally developed by John Dee and Edward Kelley in the 16th century. These visions took place at two times: in 1900 during his stay in Mexico, and later in 1909 in Algeria in the company of poet Victor Benjamin Neuburg. Of all his works, Crowley considered this book to be second in importance behind The Book of the Law, the text that established his religious and philosophical system of Thelema in 1904. It was first published in 1911.

The Vision and the Voice is the source of many of the central spiritual doctrines of Thelema, especially in the visions of Babalon and her consort Chaos (the "All-Father"), as well as an account of how an individual might cross the Abyss, thereby assuming the title of "Master of the Temple" and taking a place in the City of the Pyramids under the Night of Pan.

The source manuscript (in five numbered notebooks) can be viewed at Harry Ransom Center collection in Austin, Texas.

Editions

References

External links
The Vision and the Voice at Internet Sacred Text Archive.
The Vision and the Voice (Notebook Edition), source notebooks from Algeria and Mexico .
University of Texas (Austin) Crowley holdings, Box 5 Folders 1-3, Harry Ransom Collection

Enochian magic
Thelemite texts
Works by Aleister Crowley